Voodoo Child may refer to:

Related to Jimi Hendrix 
 "Voodoo Child (Slight Return)", a 1968 song by The Jimi Hendrix Experience
 "Voodoo Chile", another song by The Jimi Hendrix Experience
 Voodoo Child: The Jimi Hendrix Collection, a 2001 album
 Voodoo Child: The Illustrated Legend of Jimi Hendrix, a graphic biography illustrated by Bill Sienkiewicz

Other uses 
 "Voodoo Child" (Rogue Traders song), a 2005 dance song
 Voodoo Child (comics), a comic book from Virgin Comics
 Voodoo Child (band), a Rock and Roll band from Guwahati, Assam
 "Voodoo Child", a short story by Graham Masterton
 Moby (born 1965), or Voodoo Child, electronic musician

See also 
 Voodoo (disambiguation)